Dato' Haji Sidek Abdullah Kamar (19 January 1936 – 17 October 2005) was a Malaysian badminton coach, former player and the father of Malaysia's most famous badminton-playing family, Sidek brothers who represented Malaysia in badminton.

It was his sons who played the biggest roles to take Malaysia out of the doldrums in world badminton, culminating in the success to regain the Thomas Cup after a lapse of 25 years in 1992.

Mohd Sidek laid the groundwork for his son's rise to stardom in Malaysian badminton. Led by Misbun, the Sidek brothers began their domination of the game from the early 1980s to 2000.

Early life and education
Sidek was born on 19 January 1936, at Kampung Kanchong Darat, Banting, Selangor. He attended the SMKA Al-Mashoor (L) Islamic religious school in Penang. His father, Abdullah Kamar Salimin was a farmer and herdsman.

Career
 1957: Started playing competitively at the age of 21.
 1959-1964: Kuala Langat district-level champion (singles and doubles with Sukarman Abdul Rahim).
 1959: Malay junior champion.
 1964: Novice Cup champion.
 1964-2005: Retired early from sporting and trained his children at a self-built two-court outdoor badminton hall in front of his home; later he groomed youngsters at the Kg. Kanchong Darat Civic Centre (a two-court multi-purpose badminton hall).

Highlights of his children’s achievements
Misbun:
National champion (1980-1984 and 1986–1987); National Sportsman award (1981,1983); World Cup runner-up (1982); All-England runner-up (1986).

Razif-Jalani:
All-England champion (1982); World Grand Prix Finals champions (1986, 1988,1989, 1991); Commonwealth Games (1990); World Cup champions (1990, 1991); Thomas Cup champions (1992); Barcelona Olympics bronze medal (1992).

Rashid:
Commonwealth Games champion (1990, 1994); Thomas Cup champions (1992); Atlanta Olympics bronze medal (1996); All-England runner-up (1996); National Sportsman Award (1990, 1991, 1992, 1996).

Rahman:
Member of the Thomas Cup winning team (1992).

Zamaliah:
Member of Commonwealth Games silver medal-winning team (1994).

Personal life
Sidek was married three times. His first marriage was with his most beloved wife, Rukinah Sulaiman (1938-2003) in 1956, when he was 20 and she was only 18 and they are blessed with 8 children namely Rusitah (born 1958), Misbun (born 1960), Razif (born 1962), Jalani (born 1964), Rahman (born 1966), Rashid (born 1968), Zamaliah (born 1970) and Shahrezan (born 1972).

After his wife, Rukinah whom he fondly called Kinah died in January 2003, he remarried Juriah Abd Wahab, but divorced after a short while. Then, Sidek later married his third wife Bangaton Rasman also in 2003 and it lasted until his death two years later in 2005.

Death
Sidek died at about 2:25am on 17 October 2005, during that year's seasonal observance of the Islamic holy month of Ramadan at the Tengku Ampuan Rahimah Hospital (HTAR) in Klang, at the age of 69 due to kidney failure, diabetes, pneumonia and high blood pressure. He was buried at the Banting Muslim cemetery.

His wife, Rukinah Sulaiman (born 1938), suffered a stroke and died on January 30, 2003, at the age of 65, after being united in marriage for the past 47 years since 1956.

Honours
1990: Benson and Hedges Gold Award for Sports Personality.

2003: Malaysia's all-time sports personality award from Sports Ministry.

2003: Presented with honorary doctorate in Sports Science by Universiti Putra Malaysia (UPM).

Honour of Malaysia
  : Member of the Order of the Defender of the Realm (A.M.N.) (1987)

Notes

See also
 Sidek brothers
 Misbun Sidek
 Razif Sidek
 Jalani Sidek
 Rashid Sidek
 Rahman Sidek

References

External links
 Sidek Abdullah Kamar biography at Nusa Mahsuri.

1936 births
2005 deaths
People from Selangor
Malaysian Muslims
Malaysian people of Malay descent
Badminton coaches
Members of the Order of the Defender of the Realm